According to Hasidic legend, Rabbi Adam Baal Shem of Ropczyce was a Rabbi and Mystic who lead a group of Hidden Tzaddikim called Machane Yisroel, started by Rabbi Eliyahu Baal Shem of Loans. The leadership of the movement was later handed down to Rabbi Yoel Baal Shem, who in turn handed it down to Rabbi Adam Baal Shem, who in turn handed it down to Rabbi Yisrael ben Eliezer, the Baal Shem Tov.

According to the Chernobyler chassidic tradition, he was the grandfather of Rabbi Menachem Nochum Twerski of Chernobyl.
whose full name was Rabbi Adam nochum Shustak.The exact identity of Rabbi Adam is unknown. Since the name Adam was rare among European Jewry, Gershom Scholem considers it to be a pseudonym for Heshel Zoref (died 1700). According to Rabbi Aryeh Kaplan, others identify this Adam with Rabbi David Moshe Abraham (whose initials are Adam) of Troyes or with Adam Zerweiker. Kaplan also writes that it may be an anonym to protect the subject's identity.    

According to the Shivhei HaBesht, Rabbi Adam found manuscripts in a cave, containing hidden secrets of the Torah. Rabbi Adam asked in a dream to whom should he hand down the manuscripts? He was answered to hand them down to Rabbi Israel ben Eliezer of the city of Okopy. Before his death, he commanded his only son, who was an eminent scholar, to search for the city with that name and hand the manuscripts to Israel ben Eliezer. After Rabbi Adam died, his son traveled until he arrived at Okopy, where he married the daughter of a wealthy man and eventually gave the manuscripts to the Baal Shem Tov.

References 

Baal Shem
Hasidic Judaism
Legendary Jews
People from Ropczyce-Sędziszów County
Place of birth unknown
Place of death unknown
Year of birth unknown
Year of death unknown